Andrzej Nartowski (14 November 1931 – 3 September 2003) was a Polish basketball player. He competed in the men's tournament at the 1960 Summer Olympics.

References

External links
 

1931 births
2003 deaths
Polish men's basketball players
Olympic basketball players of Poland
Basketball players at the 1960 Summer Olympics
Sportspeople from Kalisz
20th-century Polish people